Shahid Beheshti University of Medical Sciences (SBUMS, Danushgah-e 'lum-e Pezeshki-ye vâ Xedâmat-e Behedashti - Dârmani-ye Shihid Beheshti) is one of the three medical universities in Tehran, the capital of Iran. It began in 1961 with the establishment of the Schools of Medicine and Dentistry. Following the merging of some of the treatment and educational units and organizations affiliated with the then-Ministry of Health and “Melli University” (National University) in 1986, Shahid Beheshti University of Medical Sciences began its activities independently.

In addition to educating students and facilitating research, the university is responsible for providing healthcare for the five million citizens who live in the northern and eastern parts of Tehran as well as in some of the cities near the capital.

The university is government funded. Its administration is made up of the Board of Trustees, the Chancellor, the University Council, and eight Vice -Chancellors in international, academic and education, research, health, treatment, food and drugs, logistics, and students affairs.

SBUMS is the second largest medical university in Iran and educates 12,500 students in medicine and allied medical sciences.

Former presidents 
 Dr. Fereydoon Azizi 
 Dr. Seyed Mahmood Tabatabaeifard
 Dr. Habibollah Peyravi
 Dr. Alireza Zali
 Dr. Shahin Mohammadsadeghi
 Dr. Mohammadreza Razaghi
 Dr. Ali asghar Peyvandi
 Dr. Mohammad Haji Aghajani

Ranking

URAP (University Ranking by Academic Performance)
 2012-2013: Rank in world: 2016, Medical: 6
 2013-2014: Rank in world: 1711, Medical: 5
 2014-2015: Rank in world: 1053, Medical: 5
 2015-2016: Rank in world: 926, Medical: 2

Colleges and schools

Schools
The university has 12 schools admitting students for 40 fellowships, 24 sub-specialties, 34 specialties, 43 PhDs, 3 general medical fields (medicine, dentistry, and pharmacy), to 63 majors at MSC and BSC levels. The university has 1300 academic staff that educates 12,500 students.
The university includes 4 research institutes and 62 research centers.
School of Medicine
School of Dentistry
School of Pharmacy
School of Public Health
School of Rehabilitation
School of Traditional Medicine
School of Paramedical Sciences
School of Medical Education Sciences
School of Nursing And Midwifery
School of Health, Safety And Environment
School of Advanced Technologies in Medicine
School of Nutrition Sciences & Food Technology

Research institutes
 Research Institute for Dental Sciences
 Research Institute for Endocrine Science
 National Nutrition and Food Technology Research Institute
 National Research Institute for Tuberculosis and Lung Diseases

Research centers
 Anesthesiology Research Center
 Behavioral Science Research Center
 Cancer Research Center
 Cardio-Vascular Research Center
 Cellular and Molecular Biology Research Center
 Cellular and Molecular Endocrine Research Center
 Chronic Respiratory Disease Research Center
 Clinical Tuberculosis and Epidemiology Research Center
 Dental Research Center
 Dentofacial Deformities Research Center
 Endocrinology Research Center
 Endocrine Physiology Research Center
 Endodontic Research Center
 Infectious Diseases and Tropical Medicine Research Center
 Infertility and Reproductive Health Research Center
 Laser Application in Medical Sciences Research Center
 Lung Transplantation Research Center
 Medical Ethics and Law Research Center
 Mycobacteriology Research Center
 Neuroscience Research Center
 Nutrition And Endocrine Research Center
 Ophthalmic Research Center
 Pediatric Congenital Hematologic Disorders Research Center
 Pediatric Respiratory Disease Research Center
 Pediatric Surgery Research Center
 Pharmaceutical Sciences Research Center
 Physical-Therapy Research Center
 Phytochemistry Research Center
 Prevention and Treatment of Obesity Research Center
 Preventive Dentistry Research Center
 Prevention of Metabolic Diseases Research Center
 Protein Technology Research Center
 Proteomics Research Center
 Reproductive Endocrinology Research Center
 Research Center for Gastroenterology and Liver Diseases
 Research Center for Genomics
 Research Center for Medical Nano-Technology and Tissue Engineering
 Research Center for Neurosurgery and Functional Nerves
 Safety Promotion and Injury Prevention Research Center 
 Skin Research Center
 Skull Base Research Center
 Social Determinants of Health Research Center
 Telemedicine Research Center
 Tobacco Prevention and Control Research Center
 Toxicological Research Center
 Tracheal Disease Research Center
 Traditional Medicine and Materia Medica Research Center
 Urology and Nephrology Research Center
 Virology Research Center
 Pediatric Infectious Diseases Research Center
 Pediatric Neurology Research Center

University WHO collaborating centers
 WHOCC for Endocrine & Metabolism Diseases (Research Institute for Endocrine Sciences)
 WHOCC for Tuberculosis Education (Research Institute for Lung Diseases)
 WHOCC for Training & Research Dental Public Health (School of Dentistry)
 WHOCC for the Eye Health and Prevention of Blindness Program (Ophthalmic Research Center)
 WHOCC on Tobacco Control (Tobacco Prevention and Control Research Center)
 WHOCC for Research and Training in Nutrition (National Nutrition and Food Technology Research Institute)
 WHOCC for Educational Development (Educational Development Centre)

Programmes

Vice-Chancellor in International Affairs
The university admits international students in different levels and degrees. All registration affairs are undertaken by the office of vice-chancellor.

Vice-Chancellor in Research Affairs

Vice-Chancellor in Academic Affairs

Vice-Chancellor in Health Affairs

Vice-Chancellor in Treatment Affairs

Vice-Chancellor in Food and Drugs Affairs
The National Center of Drug and Toxin Information began its mission in 2010.

Vice-Chancellor in Student and Cultural Affairs

Vice-Chancellor in Administration and Resources Development Affairs
SBUMS Vice-Chancellor Office in Administration and Resources Development Affairs is in charge of developing resources for educational, academic, research, health, and treatment needs, including human, financial, physical, and information resources.

See also
 Higher Education in Iran
 Shahid Beheshti University

References

External links

 SBUMS Official website

Medical schools in Iran
Shahid Beheshti University of Medical Sciences
Educational institutions established in 1960
1960 establishments in Iran